Dale-Gudbrand's farm is a historical site in Hundorp in the municipality of Sør-Fron in Norway's Gudbrand Valley. It was selected as the millennium site (see Millennium site) for Oppland county and for the municipality of Sør-Fron in 1999. The farm lies in the middle of a major tumulus area dating back to the Iron Age. In 1755 Gerhard Schøning described five large grave mounds there as one of them was being removed. In addition to the mounds, there is a square ring of stones and the remains of a round ring of stones at the site. There are also two medium-sized tumuli at the neighboring Hjetlund farm associated with the large tumuli at Hundorp.

Heimskringla, Snorri Sturluson's collection of sagas about the Norwegian kings, describes a meeting between Olaf II of Norway and the hersir Dale-Gudbrand on the farm in 1021 in chapter 113 of the Separate Saga of St. Olaf. Olaf II tricked Dale-Gudbrand and his peasant army into looking away from the idol of Thor by saying, "See, our God comes with great light!" while pointing to the sunrise in the east. At the same time, one of Olaf II's men, Kolbein the Strong, broke the statue of Thor with his club. This was the start of the introduction of Christianity into the Gudbrand Valley, and Dale-Gudbrand was later forced to build a church on his farm. The club of Kolbein the Strong is also depicted in the coat of arms of Sør-Fron.

See also
 Dale-Gudbrand

References

External links 
 Dale-Gudbrand's farm: Information about setting up the cultural center
 Gudbrand Valley Museum on Dale-Gudbrand's farm

Museums in Innlandet
Sør-Fron
11th century in Norway
History of Innlandet
Millennium sites
Conflicts in 1021